Tel-Yeruham Dam, also known as, Yeruham Dam is a masonry dam situated on the Revivim Stream, a tributary of the HaBesor Stream, in Yeruham, Southern District, Israel. The dam has many purposes which include flood control, irrigation, municipal water supply, tourism and recreation. It impounded Lake Yeruham between 1953 and 1954. In 1974 the area around the lake was improved with plants and facilities to improve recreation.

Construction 

Construction on the dam began in 1951 and was completed 2 years later in 1953. After Construction, the dam had problems of leakage happening through the walls. Repairs were carried out and reduced the seepage losses of water from 30cm/day to 12mm/day.

References

Dams in Israel
Dams completed in 1954
Buildings and structures in Southern District (Israel)
Masonry dams
Tourist attractions in Southern District (Israel)